The 1921 Santa Clara Missionites football team was an American football team that represented Santa Clara University as an independent during the 1921 college football season. The team compiled a 6–0 record, shut out five of six opponents, and outscored all opponents by a total of 224 to 9.

On September 1, 1921, Santa Clara hired Harry G. Buckingham as its football coach. He played football as a tackle at Princeton and later coached at Colorado School of Mines and Memphis University. He remained as Santa Clara's football coach for two years.

Schedule

References

Santa Clara
Santa Clara Broncos football seasons
College football undefeated seasons
Santa Clara Missionites football